The 2008 Saskatchewan Scotties Tournament of Hearts women's provincial curling championship, was held from January 23 to 27 at the North Battleford Civic Centre in North Battleford, Saskatchewan. The winning team of Michelle Englot, represented Saskatchewan at the 2008 Scotties Tournament of Hearts in Regina, Saskatchewan, where she would finish with a 5–6 record.

Teams

Round-robin standings
Final round-robin standings

Results

Draw 1
January 23, 2:00 PM CT

Draw 2
January 23, 7:00 PM CT

Draw 3
January 24, 2:00 PM CT

Draw 4
January 24, 7:00 PM CT

Draw 5
January 25, 9:30 AM CT

Draw 6
January 25, 2:00 PM CT

Draw 7
January 25, 7:00 PM CT

Draw 8
January 26, 9:30 AM CT

Draw 9
January 26, 2:00 PM CT

Playoffs

Semifinal
January 26, 7:00 PM CT

Final
January 27, 2:00 PM CT

References

Saskatchewan Scotties Tournament Of Hearts, 2008
North Battleford
Curling in Saskatchewan
Saskatchewan Scotties